

References

External links
 NAACP Theatre Awards

African-American theatre
NAACP Theatre Awards
Dramatist and playwright awards
Awards established in 1991